Coralliophila rashafunensis is a species of sea snail, a marine gastropod mollusk, in the family Muricidae, the murex snails or rock snails.

Description
The length of the shell attains 22 mm.

Distribution
This species occurs in the Indian Ocean off Somalia.

References

Endemic fauna of Somalia
rashafunensis
Gastropods described in 2018